Chen Zaidao (24 January 1909 – 6 April 1993) was a Chinese general in the People's Liberation Army, who commanded the Wuhan Military Region from 1954 to 1967. He is most noted for having arrested pro-Mao Xie Fuzhi and Wang Li during the Wuhan Incident in July 1967. He was promptly dismissed after the incident, but was rehabilitated in 1972 and entered the Central Committee of the Chinese Communist Party in 1978.

During the Tiananmen Square protests of spring 1989, Chen Zaidao joined former Minister of Defense Zhang Aiping and five other retired generals in opposing the enforcement of martial law by the Army in Beijing.

See also
List of officers of the People's Liberation Army

References 

1909 births
1993 deaths
Victims of the Cultural Revolution
Politicians from Huanggang
People's Liberation Army generals from Hubei
Chinese Communist Party politicians from Hubei
People's Republic of China politicians from Hubei
Commanders of the Henan Military District
Vice Chairpersons of the National Committee of the Chinese People's Political Consultative Conference